Heather Miley Cloud is an American politician, businesswoman, and educator from the state of Louisiana. A Republican, Cloud has represented the 28th district in the Louisiana State Senate since 2020.

From 2011 until 2019, Cloud served as the mayor of Turkey Creek, where she and her husband also operate a trucking business and a café. In 2018, Cloud ran in a special election for Louisiana Secretary of State, but came in 8th place with 5% of the vote.

In July 2019, Cloud announced her candidacy to succeed term-limited Democratic State Senator Eric LaFleur. That October, Cloud defeated Democratic State Representatives Robert Johnson and Bernard LeBas with 63% of the vote.

References

Living people
People from Evangeline Parish, Louisiana
Republican Party Louisiana state senators
Women in Louisiana politics
Women state legislators in Louisiana
21st-century American politicians
Year of birth missing (living people)
21st-century American women politicians